Ardalan Afshar (born 20 September 1984 in Tehran), better known by his stage name Nazar, is an Austrian rapper of Iranian descent from Vienna.

Biography
Nazar grew up in Vienna, Austria. His father had died as a soldier in the Iran-Iraq War, whereupon his mother fled to Austria with him and his brother. Nazar spent his youth in Vienna's district of Favoriten, where at this time he often clashed with neo-Nazis. In 2006 Nazar began his career as a rapper. At a gig near Stuttgart, he was discovered by the record label Assphalt Muzik. In 2007, Nazar published several songs on the Internet, which spread quickly even outside the country.

In June 2008 the charges of robbery against him were dropped. Nazar's lawyer said his client had in the commotion "just" pulled a gun and threatened to beat the opponent.

On 12 March 2010 Nazar published the album Artkore with RAF Camora.

On 13 May he released his album Fakker, which was co-produced again by RAF Camora.

Discography

Albums

Singles

Featured in

 Juice-Exclusives
 2010: "Fakkergeddon" (feat. RAF Camora) (Juice Exclusive!)
 2011: "Glaubs mir" (feat. RAF 3.0) (Juice Exclusive!)
 Freetracks
 2009: "Flammen über Wien Pt. 2" (feat. RAF Camora)
 2010: "Meine Stadt" (feat. Chakuza, Kamp and RAF Camora)
 2010: "Sagol" (feat. RAF Camora & Playboy 51)

Videography
 "Sandsturm" (12 August 2012)
 "Lost in Translation" (27 July 2012)
 "Narkose" (25 August 2012)
 "Danke für alles" (feat. O.Z & Dj Paul Blaze) (17 September 2012)
 "Intro" (16 June 2013)
 "Abrakadabra" (5 July 2013)
 "An Manchen Tagen" (19 July 2013)
 "Intro" (16 June 2014)
 "Rapbeef" (27 June 2014)
 "Borderliner" (11 July 2014)
 "Freundlicher Diktator" (28 August 2014)
 "Zwischen Zeit & Raum" (15 August 2014)

Filmografie 
 2011: Schwarzkopf - A film about identity, longing and a new generation of Viennese by director Arman T. Riahi.

External links

References 

Living people
1984 births
People from Tehran
Austrian rappers